The Stechkin or APS (Avtomaticheskiy Pistolet Stechkina = Автоматический Пистолет Стечкина) is a Soviet selective fire machine pistol chambered in 9×18mm Makarov and 9×19mm Parabellum introduced into service in 1951 for use with artillery and mortar crews, tank crews and aircraft personnel, where a cumbersome assault rifle was deemed unnecessary. Seeing service in a number of wars such as the Vietnam War, Russo-Ukrainian War and Syrian Civil War. The APS was praised for its innovative concept and good controllability for its size. However, the high cost of the weapon, complex and time-consuming machining, combined with a limited effective range, large size and weight for a pistol, and fragile buttstock have been mentioned as a reason to phase it out of active service in favour of assault rifles such as the AKS-74U. The pistol bears the name of its developer, Igor Stechkin.

Adoption and service
Submachine guns such as the PPSh-41 or the PPS-43 were declared obsolete shortly after the adoption of the AK47 assault rifle. A new self-defence weapon was requested for artillery and mortar crews, tank crews and aircraft personnel, where a cumbersome assault rifle was deemed unnecessary.

Igor Yakovlevich Stechkin, recently graduated in 1948 from the Tula Mechanical Institute, began work on this new automatic weapon concept, competing against other prolific designers such as Vojvodin and Kalashnikov. Stechkin designed a select-fire pistol capable of accurate fire up to 200 meters, with the possibility of attaching a combination holster/shoulder stock. Field-testing of the first prototypes was undertaken from April to June 1949. A 20,000 round endurance test against an Astra machine pistol and a PPS-43 submachine gun proved that Stechkin's design was promising. However, the testing board showed flaws of the prototype, such as the lack of adjustability of the rear sight, the high weight (1.9 kg with holster), short sight radius, and the recoil spring located under the barrel.

A large redesign effort was made by Stechkin. He took several innovations from the Makarov pistol, such as the general silhouette, slide rails, extractor. The gun was lightened, the trigger mechanism redesigned and simplified, and the trigger guard reshaped. After successful military tests, the APS was formally adopted on December 3, 1951.

The APS was issued to Soviet Army vehicle operators, artillery crews, and front-line officers and law enforcement, and was used in conflicts in Angola, Libya, Mozambique, Romania, Tanzania and Zambia. The APS was praised for its innovative concept and good controllability for its size. However, the high cost of the weapon, complex and time-consuming machining, combined with a limited effective range, large size and weight for a pistol, fragile buttstock, frequent stoppages and subpar ergonomics, led to the APS being gradually phased out of active service. However, the weapon found a new niche among special forces such as the Spetsnaz or FSB, who needed a more effective sidearm than the Makarov PM. The Stechkin APS was eventually replaced by the AKS-74U compact assault rifle in 1981, offering more firepower due to its much more powerful 5.45×39mm M74 rifle ammunition, acceptable accuracy at moderate distances, and greater magazine capacity.

A contemporary derivative of the Stechkin, the OTS-33 Pernach, is also chambered for the 9×18mm Makarov cartridge.

Design details

The APS is a straight-blowback, select-fire, magazine-fed machine pistol. The weapon is fed through 20-round double-stack staggered-feed detachable steel box magazines. The APS shares features with the Makarov service pistol, such as a heel-mounted magazine release, slide-mounted safety lever, and field-strip procedure. The rear sight is adjustable from 25, 50, 100 to 200 meters through an eccentric rotating drum-dial. The serrated front sight may be drifted for windage. The slide features a textured strip on top to reduce aim-disturbing glare. The chrome-lined barrel serves as the recoil spring guide. The slide stop lever also acts as an ejector blade. The trigger guard pivots down for stripping and detents in position through a spring-loaded plunger. The checkered or serrated grips' panels are made from wood (early models), reddish-brown bakelite or black plastic.

The Stechkin features a combination safety-decocker-fire selector lever on the slide. The three-position lever, when pointed forward in the "PR" or safe position, decocks and locks the hammer, locks the slide to the frame and prevents forward travel of the free-floating firing pin. When pointed downwards to the "OD", or single-shot position, the safety lever deactivates the auto-sear and rate reducer to allow semi-automatic fire. Finally, the rearmost "AVT" position puts the APS in fully automatic mode.

The trigger mechanism of the APS is of a simple construction and features a double/single-action fire mode. It comprises a trigger and trigger bar, disconnector, sear and hammer. The rebounding hammer, when in resting state, has an intermediate safety intercept notch that does not allow forward travel of the hammer unless the sear is raised. Disconnection is achieved through a cam in the slide.

To make controllable automatic fire possible through such a system, designer Stechkin employs several mechanical solutions. Firstly, the slide has a very long stroke (three times the length of the cartridge). This allows time to slow the slide down and reduce felt recoil by minimising the jolt produced through the collision of the slide with the frame. Secondly, the rate-reducer lever offers extra resistance to the opening stroke of the slide, further slowing down the cycling process. Finally, the primary inertial rate reducing plunger delays the dropping of the hammer after the slide closes. The slide has a large cam that strikes a lever downwards. This lever transfers that energy to a spring-loaded weight located in the grip. The weight travels down, compressing its spring, then slams back up into the trigger bar, tripping the sear and firing the gun. Effectively, the rate reducer, which reduced the automatic rate of fire from 1,000 RPM to 750RPM, also acts as the auto-sear.

The machine pistol may be fitted with a wooden (early), brown bakelite or steel wire shoulder stock (for the APB variant); otherwise, the weapon becomes difficult to control on full auto. The stock is attached via a T-slot cut into the rear strap of the pistol frame. The stock is hollowed out and can act as a holster, accepting the machine pistol inside, similar to the Mauser C96 pistol. A Leather sling and ammunition pouch were also supplied with the weapon.

APB

The APB (Avtomaticheskiy Pistolet Besshumniy, meaning automatic silenced pistol) version was a version of the APS optimized for silent operations. Developed in the early 1970s by A.S. Neugodov (А.С. Неугодов) under the factory name AO-44, it was officially adopted in 1972 under the service name APB and given GRAU index 6P13. Approximately 2,000 APS pistols were converted to APB variants by the Vyatskie Polyansky Machine-Building Plant from 1972 to 1973. Muzzle velocity reportedly dropped to 290 m/s in this variant. Instead of the holster-stock of the APS, the APB comes with a detachable stock made of steel wire. Its barrel is longer than that of the APS; it protrudes from the slide and is threaded for the attachment of an eccentric sound suppressor. When not in use, the detachable sound suppressor can be clipped to the stock.

During the Soviet–Afghan War, the APB was used by Soviet Spetsnaz team leaders as an extra weapon; they usually carried on a sling with the suppressor and stock mounted. It was used by radio operators and even by some heavy gun crews. Special forces units of the Ministry of Internal Affairs (MVD) such as the OMON and the SOBR have also used the pistol.

Users 
 
 
 
 : People's Armed Police Force
 
 
 : State Courier Service
 
 
 : People's Movement for the Liberation of Azawad
 : Manufactured variant known as Dracula md. 98
 : Used by various police forces and security guards of the Central Bank of The Russian Federation
 : Used in limited amounts in the Kobre anti-terrorist unit.

See also
 List of Russian weaponry
 PB (pistol)
 Škorpion
 FB PM-63

References

External links

 Modern Firearms - Stechkin APS pistol
 Modern Firearms -  APB / 6P13 silenced pistol
 APB Silenced Machine Pistol
 Юрий Пономарёв, АПС, Kalashnikov magazine 2005/1, pp 34–43; has some APS diagrams 
 Photos of APS and APB in service
 APB photo gallery; disassembled photo showing the expansion tube and drilled barrel
  
  

9×18mm Makarov machine pistols
9mm Parabellum submachine guns 
Cold War firearms of the Soviet Union
Silenced firearms
Pistols of the Soviet Union
Police weapons
Vyatskiye Polyany Machine-Building Plant products
Weapons and ammunition introduced in 1951